David Pritchard may refer to:

 David Pritchard (chess player) (1919–2005), British chess writer
 David Pritchard (cricketer) (1893–1983), Australian cricketer
 David Pritchard (footballer) (born 1972), English former footballer
 David Pritchard (musician) (born 1949), American guitarist
 David E. Pritchard (born 1941), physics professor at the Massachusetts Institute of Technology